A budenovka is a distinctive type of hat, an archetypal part of the Communist military uniforms of the Russian Civil War following the Russian revolution (1917–1922) and later conflicts. Its official name was the "broadcloth helmet" (шлем суконный). Named after Red Army cavalry commander Semyon Budyonny, it was also known as the "frunzenka" after the Commissar Mikhail Frunze. It is a soft, woolen hat that covers the ears and neck. The cap features a peak and folded earflaps that can be buttoned under the chin.

History

The hat was created as part of a new uniform for the Russian army by Viktor Vasnetsov, a famous Russian painter, who was inspired by the Kievan Rus' helmet. The original name was bogatyrka (богатырка) – the helmet of a bogatyr – and was intended to inspire Russian troops by connecting them with the legendary heroes of Russian folklore. Bogatyrkas were meant to be a part of a new uniform, so they had already been produced during World War I, but hadn't been officially adopted. Another version, quite popular in Russia, is that bogatyrkas were designed for a military parade as a part of a "historical" stylized uniform (which also included an overcoat with "designer" cross-pieces, which evoked those worn by the Streltsy in the 16th to 18th centuries, which also were used in the Red Army to a limited extent). Some Russian historians even speculate the parade in question was a supposed victory parade in Berlin. Some view the bogatyrkas as an evolution of the bashlyk conical hoods worn by the Russian military since the mid-19th century.

During the Russian civil war, communist troops, who had no obligation to comply with the uniform standards of the Imperial Russian army, used bogatyrkas, as they were abundant and distinctive. Bogatyrkas were commonly decorated with red star pins as a distinguishing mark. Such decorations were often makeshift, but later were standardized, and a bigger star badge of broadcloth was sewn to the front of the hat, typically red but in some cases blue (for cavalry) or black (for artillery). This allowed the communists to use the image of "Red bogatyrs fighting the old Russian system, employing the original idea by Vasnetsov. At this time the hat was renamed the Budenovka after Semyon Budyonny, the commander of the First Cavalry Army, as the hat (with the blue star) was particularly popular with cavalry units. It was also called the Frunzenka after Mikhail Frunze, one of Bolshevik army leaders.

As authorised in January 1919, the budenovka was intended as a winter headdress. Made of khaki cloth, the hat included flaps capable of being pulled down and fastened under the chin. The distinctive spike was created by a stiffened coil sewn into the crown and covered by khaki cloth. The initial model with the high tip was replaced with a more practical low-tip model in 1927. A summer version briefly existed, made from lighter cloth and lacking flaps.  

The hat was not part of the Red Army uniform for long, for both political and practical reasons. Although it was relatively easy to produce, it required expensive wool, did not provide good cold-weather protection and could not be worn under a helmet. Another reason was that it belonged to the revolutionary period of Russian history in which artistic and political expression had been under less rigorous control by the state. It was abandoned during the army reforms of the mid-1930s, and phasing-out started in 1935. Budenovkas were still in use during the Winter War of 1939, and the disastrous failure of Soviet equipment and gear led to the introduction of various improved winter uniforms. The Soviet army was to receive the garrison cap (called "pilotka") and the outdoor ushanka, the latter being based on the Finnish turkislakki army fur caps. In the Red Army, Budenovka had mostly been replaced by the start of the Great Patriotic War in 1941, but some were still used by Soviet partisans.

The budenovka became part of history as Red Army cavalry men wearing budennovkas became an iconic cultural image from the Russian civil war, together with tachankas, the Nagant revolver or Mauser C96, Maxim gun and rebelling sailors with ammunition belts slung over their chests. Stylized budyonovkas were popular children's headgear until late Soviet times.

Gallery

See also
 Bashlyk

References

1910s fashion
20th-century fashion
Hats
Military history of Russia
Russian clothing
Russian inventions
Soviet military uniforms